Naizin is a former commune in the Morbihan department of Brittany in north-western France. It is the seat of the commune of Évellys. Inhabitants of Naizin are called in French Naizinois.

History 
On 1 January 2016, Moustoir-Remungol, Naizin and Remungol merged becoming one commune of Évellys.

Geography
The river Ével forms most of the commune's southern border.

See also
Communes of the Morbihan department

References

Former communes of Morbihan